Stefan Merrill Block (born 1982) is an American writer.

Biography 
Stefan Merrill Block was born in Texas and currently lives in Brooklyn, NY. He has written three novels The Story of Forgetting, The Storm at the Door and Oliver Loving.

References 

1982 births
Living people
Novelists from Texas
American male novelists
21st-century American novelists
21st-century American male writers